Catonephele orites, the orange-banded shoemaker butterfly, is a species of butterfly found throughout the northern coast of South America and into Central America.

Food 

Larvae of Catonephele orites have been found on Alchornea.

References 

Catonephele at Markku Savela's Lepidoptera and Some Other Life Forms

Biblidinae
Nymphalidae of South America
Butterflies described in 1899